Meama is an island in Tonga. It is located within the Haʻapai Group in the centre of the country, to northeast of the national capital of Nukuʻalofa.

References 

Islands of Tonga
Haʻapai